Sisyrinchium angustifolium, commonly known as narrow-leaf blue-eyed-grass, is a herbaceous perennial growing from rhizomes, native to moist meadow and open woodland. It is the most common blue-eyed grass of the eastern United States, and is also cultivated as an ornamental.

Range: Eastern Canada and US, west to Texas and Minnesota, in meadows, low woods, and shorelines.

Height: . Tepals: 6, blue, each tipped with a sharp point, veined, and darkening toward central yellow patch.

Gallery

References

Further reading 
 
 
 
 

angustifolium
Flora of Quebec
Flora of the Eastern United States
Plants described in 1768
Taxa named by Philip Miller
Flora without expected TNC conservation status